Selma Wassermann (born 1929) is a Canadian-American author, educator, and researcher. She is a Professor Emerita at Simon Fraser University, where she led the creation of the teacher education program.

Education and career 
Wassermann was born in 1929 in New York City and grew up in public schools in Brooklyn, New York. She attended City College of New York, where she received a Bachelor of Science in 1950, and a Master of Science in 1956. She earned a Doctorate of Education in 1962 from New York University.

Wassermann's first year of teaching was in San Francisco, and then she returned to New York where she taught until 1966 at which point she moved to Vancouver, British Columbia, Canada to begin the teacher education program at Simon Fraser University. Wassermann retired from teaching in 2000.

Work 
Wassermann is known for her work on child-centered education and children's books. In education, she has written on play in the classroom, case method teaching, and how to work within a K-8 classroom. Wasserman has also published children's books, including books about a chimpanzee named Moonbeam and a submariner named Sailor Jack, and an app to help children learn to read. Her book on maintaining relationships with grandchildren from afar, The Long Distance Grandmother, had its fourth edition released in 2001.

Selected publications

Awards and honors 
In 1988 Wasserman was elected to the National Humanities Faculty in the United States. In 1989 she received the award for teaching excellence from Simon Fraser University.

References 

Living people
1929 births
City College of New York alumni
New York University alumni
Academic staff of Simon Fraser University
Canadian children's writers
American children's writers